Rheims, former spelling of Reims, a city in France
 Maurice Rheims a French art auctioneer, art historian and novelist, born in Versailles
 Bettina Rheims, a French photographer born in Neuilly-sur-Seine

See also 

  Reims (disambiguation)